Blue Oval City is a planned automotive assembly complex near Stanton, Tennessee that will be operated by Ford Motor Company and SK Innovation, and is expected to be operational in 2025. The facility takes its name from Ford's logo, and will primarily consist of an automotive assembly plant that will produce electric Ford F-150 Lightning pickup trucks and a plant that will manufacture electric vehicle batteries, as well as a battery recycling facility, suppliers, and a training center. The project is expected to cost $5.6 billion, making it the most expensive single investment in Tennessee history, and employ approximately 5,800 when complete.

History 
The project was jointly announced by both companies on September 27, 2021, and a ceremony was held the following day at Shelby Farms in Memphis, providing further details of the project. The facilities will be constructed at the  Memphis Regional Megasite, also known as the West Tennessee Megasite, which had been designated as an industrial site since September 2009. The state was initially expected to provide approximately $500 million worth of incentives that include infrastructure improvements, grants, and a new campus operated by the Tennessee College of Applied Technology (TCAT) to train workers for the plants. The final cost ballooned to $884 million.

In addition to Blue Oval City, Ford and SK Innovation also announced plans to construct twin battery plants in Glendale, Kentucky called BlueOvalSK.

See also
List of Ford factories
List of automotive assembly plants in the United States

References

Ford factories
Motor vehicle assembly plants in Tennessee
2021 establishments in Tennessee
Buildings and structures in Haywood County, Tennessee